The pendant  portraits of Marten Soolmans and Oopjen Coppit are a pair of full-length wedding portraits by Rembrandt.  They were painted on the occasion of the marriage of Marten Soolmans and Oopjen Coppit in 1634. Formerly owned by the Rothschild family, they became jointly owned by the Louvre Museum and the Rijksmuseum in 2015 after both museums managed to contribute half of the purchase price of €160 million, a record for works by Rembrandt.

History
The portraits were painted by Rembrandt upon the occasion of the wedding of Marten Soolmans and Oopjen Coppit in 1634. Although the subjects were painted individually, the portraits have been kept together since their inception. Unlike many 17th-century portrait pairs, these two have always hung side by side in various collections based in Amsterdam or Paris. They are also unusual in Rembrandt's oeuvre for their size and the fact that they show the subjects at full length. Appearing in period inventories at regular intervals since their creation, together they form part of Rembrandt's core oeuvre against which other paintings with a more questionable lineage are compared. The subjects Marten Soolmans and his wife Oopjen Coppit are dressed as befits a pair of wealthy Amsterdam newlyweds. Though most in the art world agree these paintings should remain together, it became impossible for France to keep them within its borders, as the Louvre was unable to guarantee the necessary funding required to keep the ministry of culture from providing an export permit. The paintings have not been declared French national heritage.

Portrait of Marten Soolmans

Portrait of Marten Soolmans (1613-1641) was documented by Hofstede de Groot in 1915, who wrote:
{{blockquote|637 MAERTEN DAEY (1604-after 1650). Sm. 340.; Bode 303; Dut. 208; Wb. 316; B.-HdG. 107. Full length; life size. About thirty. He is seen almost in full face. He walks a little to the right on the parti-coloured stone floor, at the back of which is a step. He wears a very rich black costume, consisting of a coat with large stripes, breeches, and a short cloak of the same material, a broad and close-fitting lace collar, smooth cuffs, rosettes of lace at his waistband and on his shoes, and white stockings, with bows of rich lace on his garters. A broad-brimmed black slouch hat covers his thick fair hair; he has a plump and beardless face. His right hand rests on his hip under the cloak; his out-stretched left hand holds a glove. In the right background is a bluish-green curtain. [Pendant to 638.]

Signed on the left at foot, "Rembrandt f. 1634"; canvas, 82 inches by 52 inches. Etched by L. Flameng in the Gazette des Beaux-Arts, 1879; in the Nederlandsche Kunstbode, 1879, p. 2; and in Dutuit. Mentioned by Vosmaer, pp. 145, 502; Bode, p. 402; Dutuit, p. 52; Michel, p. 148 [112-14, 436]; Moes, 1881. Exhibited at Amsterdam 1867, No. 161.

Sale. Hendrik Daey, Alkmaar, 1798 (4000 florins, with pendant, R. M. Pruyssenaar and Adriaen Daey, who sold the pair to Van Winter for 12,000 florins). In the Van Winter collection, Amsterdam, which passed by inheritance to the Van Loons. In the Van Loon collection, Amsterdam; sold as a whole in 1877 to the Rothschilds. In the collection of Baron Gustave de Rothschild, Paris. In the collection of Baron Robert de Rothschild, Paris.| Hofstede de Groot, 1915<ref>[https://archive.org/stream/catalogueraisonn06hofsuoft#page/306/mode/1up  Entry 637 for 'Maertin Daey] in Hofstede de Groot, 1915</ref>}}

Portrait of Oopjen CoppitPortrait of Oopjen Coppit (1611-1689)''' was documented by Hofstede de Groot in 1915, who wrote:

Oopjen is wearing a flat lace collar with matching wrist collars in the latest fashion. Other Amsterdam brides of the regency class wore millstone collars well into the 1640s. She is also wearing a pearl necklace and a pearl bracelet, and pearls were considered more valuable than diamonds at that time. The format of the paintings showing the couple at full length was the most expensive form of marriage pendant and could only fit in a house with high ceilings. According to family inventories, they also owned another Rembrandt depicting the Holy Family. It is assumed that this is the Holy Family now in Munich, as that is also dated to 1634.

Identity of the sitters
The paintings were known as the "Portrait of Meneer Day" and "Portrait of Mevrouw Day" for over a century. He and his wife, who married 9 June 1633,
were only properly identified in the 20th-century.Portrait of Marten Soolmans (1613-1641), 1634 gedateerd in the RKD The confusion of the names came about because after Marten died, Oopjen remarried Captain Maerten Pietersz. Daij, and she outlived this second husband as well. After her death the paintings remained in the Daij or Daey family and members of that family assumed the portraits were of Daij and his first wife.

2016 sale
The joint purchase of these paintings was made by the Rijksmuseum and the Louvre on February 1, 2016. For the first time since 60 years, they were exhibited at the Louvre on March 10, 2016 until June 13, then for another 3 months at the Rijksmuseum, before their restoration. The intergovernmental agreement will keep these pendants together, alternately at the Louvre again, then at the Rijksmuseum for five years, followed by periods of eight years. They consequently may not be lent to other institutions.

Provenance
The portraits were in the possession of the subjects' heirs until their sale in 1877 to Gustave Samuel de Rothschild, a French banker. They were lent for exhibition once only, to the Rijksmuseum in 1956 for the artist's 350th birthday. Before being sold, they were hung in a large hall in the Van Loon collection, described by Eugène Fromentin in 1877 with the remark that they were examples of Rembrandt at his best and were painted in the same period that Rembrandt painted his Anatomy Lesson of Dr. Nicolaes Tulp, traditionally marking the beginning of his career in Amsterdam. Clearly, the flamboyance of these young newlyweds did more to launch Rembrandt's career as a portrait painter for the Amsterdam upper class than his sober depiction of a class of serious students in Leiden. The entire Van Loon collection was sold to Rothschild for 40,000 pounds, which at the time was over a million francs.

Wilhelm von Bode was impressed enough to include both in his set of 595 photogravures for his eight-volume 1898 treatise on Rembrandt. Fromentin and Bode had identified the paintings as  portraits of Mr. and Mrs. Daey, but it was the Amsterdam historian Isabella Henriette van Eeghen who painstakingly traced their ownership to their original inventories and established the identities of the portrayed.

The current joined ownership is a new arrangement for the Louvre and Rijksmuseum, and it remains to be seen whether this experiment in international art purchasing will fit into exhibition plans of both institutions. Unlike many expensive paintings, these two will not be restricted by location and it is expected that they will be on tour regularly. According to Wim Pijbes, director of the Rijksmuseum, the paintings will not be separated, and each museum will own 50 percent of each painting.

Other records
The previous record for a pair of paintings was for two Titians, his Diana and Callisto and Diana and Actaeon, that also hang side by side and are today joinedly owned by the National Gallery and the National Galleries of Scotland. The previous record for a painting purchase at the Rijksmuseum was for A Mayor of Delft and his Daughter by Jan Steen, for which they paid 11.9 million euro's in July 2004. The most expensive Rembrandt portrait sold before these is Portrait of a Foreign Admiral, sold at Christie's in December 2009 for £20 million.

Other Rembrandt portraits of women in the 1630s

See also
 List of most expensive paintings
 List of paintings by Rembrandt

References

Further reading
Press release covered in The Guardian''
551. Portrait of Madame Daey, wife of a magistrate in Smith's catalogue raisonne of 1836

Soolmans
2015 in the Netherlands
2015 in France
1634 paintings
Paintings in the collection of the Rijksmuseum
Paintings in the Louvre by Dutch, Flemish and German artists
Soolmans